Charles Dearman (born 1800, Sheffield; details of death unknown) was an English cricketer who was associated with Sheffield Cricket Club and made his first-class debut in 1828. His brother was James Dearman.

References

Bibliography
 

1800 births
Year of death unknown
English cricketers
English cricketers of 1826 to 1863
Sheffield Cricket Club cricketers